Song Ji-eun (born 4 September 1996), better known mononymously as Song Jieun, is a South Korean female handballer who plays for Incheon City and the South Korea national team.

She participated at the 2017 World Women's Handball Championship.

Individual awards  
 Top Goalscorer of the IHF Junior World Championship: 2016

References
 

1996 births
Living people 
South Korean female handball players
Handball players at the 2018 Asian Games
Asian Games gold medalists for South Korea
Asian Games medalists in handball
Medalists at the 2018 Asian Games